"Dirty Little Secrets" is the tenth episode of the Once Upon a Time spin-off series Once Upon a Time in Wonderland.

Plot

Cyrus recalls the events that led to the binding price he and his brothers had to pay. Meanwhile, the Red Queen and the Knave are forced to confront the Jabberwocky.

Production
Adam Nussdorf & Rina Mimoun were the writers for the episode, while Alex Zakrzewski was its director.

Reception

Ratings
The episode was watched by 3.22 million American viewers, and received an 18-49 rating/share of 0.8/3, roughly the same total viewers number as the previous episode but down in the demo. The show placed fourth in its timeslot and fourteenth for the night.

Critical reception
Christine Orlando of TV Fanatic gave the episode a 4.5 out of 5, signaling positive reviews.

Ashley B. of Spoiler TV gave the episode a positive review. She said:

References

External links
 

2014 American television episodes
Once Upon a Time in Wonderland episodes